Garik may refer to:

People
Garik Israelian (b. 1963), Armenian-Spanish astronomer
Garik Martirosyan (b. 1974), Armenian entertainer
Garik Samanba (b. 1957), Abkhaz politician 
Garik Sukachov (b. 1959), Russian poet and musician
 Garik Kimovich Weinstein (b. 1963), birth name of Russian chess master Garry Kasparov

Places
Garik, Kerman, a village in Kerman Province, Iran
Garik, Shahr-e Babak, a village in Kerman Province, Iran
Garik, West Azerbaijan, a village in West Azerbaijan Province, Iran